The women's 5000 metres at the 2010 European Athletics Championships was held at the Estadi Olímpic Lluís Companys on 1 August.

Medalists

Records

Schedule

Results

Final

References
 Final Results
Full results

5000
5000 metres at the European Athletics Championships
2010 in women's athletics